75% of the qualification places for Sailing at the 2012 Summer Olympics were awarded based on results at the 2011 ISAF Sailing World Championships, and the remaining 25% at the World Championships for each boat class.

Qualification timeline

Qualification progress

Summary

Men's events

Windsurfer – RS:X

One-person dinghy – Laser

Heavyweight one-person dinghy – Finn

Two-person dinghy – 470

Skiff – 49er

Keelboat – Star

Women's events

Windsurfer – RS:X

One-person dinghy – Laser Radial

Two-person dinghy – 470

Match racing – Elliott 6m

External links
 2011 ISAF World Championships

References

Qualification for the 2012 Summer Olympics
Qualification
2012